Callicarpa shikokiana, commonly called Shikoku beautyberry or China beautyberry, is a plant species in the Lamiaceae and is native to China. It is a shrub with pink flowers in summer and purple fruit in the fall.  The berry-like fruit is a drupe. It is cultivated in home gardens and national parks as an ornamental plant. The leaves turn yellow in the fall.

References

External links
Callicarpa shikokiana info

shikokiana